RG3 is a nickname for Robert Griffin III, an American football quarterback.

RG3 may also refer to:
 1991 RG3, an alternative name for the 48456 Wilhelmwien asteroid
 1986 RG3, an alternative name for the 10498 Bobgent asteroid
 1997 RG3, an alternative name for the 10211 La Spezia asteroid
 RG3, a postcode in the RG postcode area in England

RG-3 may refer to :
 RG-3, a type of the Lamborghini Gallardo

Rg3 may refer to :
 a chess move of a rook on the g3-square